The 1931 season was the Chicago Bears' 12th in the National Football League. The team was unable to improve on their 9–4–1 record from 1930 and finished with an 8–5 record under sophomore head coach Ralph Jones. The club finished in third place once again behind the Green Bay Packers and the Portsmouth Spartans. The Bears opened the season well, winning three of their first four games, including victories over the Cardinals and Giants. Chicago then dropped two in a row, both at home to the Packers and Yellowjackets. Four consecutive wins in the middle of the season put the Bears back in contention; however, another weak ending, losing two of their last three, made the season somewhat of a disappointment. Grange and Nagurski again carried the team, with 9 touchdowns between them (7 by Grange). The Bears' biggest weakness was an aging interior line, with few young linemen joining the team who had an impact. They also lacked a consistent kicking game, now that Paddy Driscoll and the Sternaman brothers had all retired. Owner George Halas would remedy these problems over the next few years and get the Bears back on top.

Future Hall of Fame players
Red Grange, back
Link Lyman, tackle
Bronko Nagurski, fullback
George Trafton, center

Other leading players
Carl Brumbaugh, quarterback
Garland Grange, end
Luke Johnsos, end
Keith Molesworth, back
William Senn, back

Other players
Joe Lintzenich, FB/HB

Players departed from 1930
Joe Sternaman, quarterback (retired)

Schedule

Standings

Chicago Bears
Chicago Bears seasons
Chicago Bears